The following highways are numbered 627:

Canada
 Alberta Highway 627

United States